Before I Fall is a 2017 American science fiction teen drama film directed by Ry Russo-Young and written by Maria Maggenti and Gina Prince-Bythewood, based on the 2010 novel of the same name by Lauren Oliver. The film stars Zoey Deutch, Halston Sage, Logan Miller, Kian Lawley, Elena Kampouris, Diego Boneta and Jennifer Beals.

The film had its world premiere at the Sundance Film Festival on January 21, 2017, and was theatrically released on March 3, 2017, by Open Road Films. It received mixed reviews from critics and grossed $18million worldwide against its $5million budget.

Plot 
Samantha Kingston wakes on February 12, known as Cupid's Day. She is picked up by her friends, queen bee Lindsay, Ally and Elody, who are excited about Sam's plans to lose her virginity to her boyfriend Rob that night. During a class lecture on Sisyphus, students distribute roses, with Sam getting one from Rob and another from a boy named Kent McFuller, a former grade school friend who is in love with her. Kent invites her to a party at his house, but she is unenthusiastic. During lunch the girls make fun of Juliet Sykes, an outsider girl who they view as a "psycho". At the party, Juliet shows up. Lindsay confronts her and the two fight, resulting in many of the guests dousing her with beer. Humiliated, Juliet leaves in tears. As Sam and her friends are driving back from the party, the car hits something and crashes, apparently killing them.

Sam wakes in her room on Cupid's Day again. Thinking the previous day was just a nightmare, Sam continues on with her day but finds that the similar events occur, and they again crash after leaving the party, though slightly later. Sam wakes up on the same day again. Realizing she is in a time loop, she convinces the group to have a sleepover instead of going to the party. They avoid the crash, but find out later in the night that Juliet committed suicide, with Sam also discovering that Lindsay and Juliet were once best friends. Even though Sam manages to avoid the crash, she continues to live through the same day over and over again.

Realizing that nothing she does matters, she starts doing whatever she wants, first airing her grievances with everyone she knows, then trying to spend more quality time with the ones she loves. During these loops, she attempts to make amends with Anna Cartullo, a student she had bullied, and becomes closer to Kent, who comforts her after an unsatisfying first sexual experience with Rob.

In another loop, at the party, Sam and Kent remember their earlier friendship, with Kent recalling how she had heroically defended him from a bully after his father died and that he had resolved to one day be her hero. Afterwards, they share a kiss. She hears the fight between Lindsay and Juliet from the hall and chases after her through the woods. Sam tries to apologize and learns from Juliet that Lindsay's misery from her parents' fighting and divorce caused her to start wetting her bed. When the two were on a camping trip and Lindsay wet her sleeping bag, she blamed Juliet and had been bullying her ever since. Juliet commits suicide by running in front of Lindsay's car, horrifying Sam, and making her realize that it was Juliet who was hit by the car on the original day.

Sam wakes up again with a sense of calm and understanding, knowing what she must do to end the loop. She resolves to be kind and considerate as she goes about her day. She sends roses to both Juliet and Kent, breaks up with Rob and tells her friends why she loves them. At the party, she kisses Kent and tells him she loves him. She again intervenes to save Juliet, but when Juliet attempts to run into traffic, Sam pushes her out of the way at the last second and is killed by a truck. As she dies, Sam remembers all the good times she has had. Sam's spirit sees Juliet standing over her body saying that Sam saved her; Sam states, "No. You saved me."

Cast 

 Zoey Deutch as Samantha Kingston
 Halston Sage as Lindsay Edgecombe
 Logan Miller as Kent McFuller
 Kian Lawley as Rob Cokran
 Elena Kampouris as Juliet Sykes
 Diego Boneta as Mr. Daimler
 Jennifer Beals as Mrs. Kingston, Samantha and Izzy's mother
 Cynthy Wu as Ally Harris
 Medalion Rahimi as Elody
 Liv Hewson as Anna Cartullo
 Nicholas Lea as Dan Kingston, Samantha and Izzy's father
 Erica Tremblay as Izzy Kingston, Samantha's sister
 Claire Corlett as Devil Cupid
 Roan Curtis as Marian Sykes

Production 
On July 15, 2010, Fox 2000 Pictures bought the feature film rights to the teen novel Before I Fall, Lauren Oliver's debut, which was published that year. Maria Maggenti was hired to adapt the novel into a screenplay, while Jonathan Shestack was set to produce and Ginny Pennekamp to co-produce. The film is about a high school student who re-lives the same day until she gets everything in her life right. In 2011, the script was listed among the Black List of best unproduced screenplays. Ry Russo-Young was attached as the film's director. On September 15, 2015, it was announced that Zoey Deutch had been cast in the film's lead role, Samantha Kingston. Brian Robbins and Matthew Kaplan produced the film through their Awesomeness Films, along with Shestack, with production starting in late October 2015. On October 27, 2015, more cast was announced, consisting of Halston Sage, Logan Miller, Kian Lawley, Diego Boneta, and Elena Kampouris. Good Universe handled the film's international sales at the American Film Market. On November 3, 2015, Jennifer Beals joined the film's cast, to play Samantha's mother. On November 20, 2015, Liv Hewson was cast in the film to play Anna Cartullo. Adam Taylor composed the film's score.

Filming
Principal photography on the film began on November 16, 2015, in Squamish, British Columbia, where they filmed at Quest University. Shooting also took place in and around Vancouver. Filming ended on December 19, 2015.

Release
In May 2016, Open Road Films acquired U.S distribution rights to the film. Before I Fall had its world premiere at the Sundance Film Festival on January 21, 2017. The film was originally scheduled to be released on April 7, 2017, but was moved up to March 3. It also screened in Italy at Giffoni Film Festival on July 18, 2017.

Home media
The film was released on DVD and Blu-ray on May 30, 2017, in the United States by Universal Pictures Home Entertainment.

Reception

Box office
Before I Fall grossed $12.2million in the United States and Canada and $6.7million in other territories for a worldwide gross of $18.9million.

In the United States and Canada, Before I Fall opened alongside The Shack and Logan, and was projected to gross around $4million in its opening weekend. It ended up opening to $4.69million. In its second weekend the film grossed $3.1million, dropping just 34% and again finishing 6th at the box office.

Critical response
On Rotten Tomatoes, the film holds an approval rating of 64% based on 124 reviews, with an average rating of 5.9/10. The site's critical consensus reads, "Before I Falls familiar ingredients are enlivened by a fresh YA perspective and a strong performance from emerging star Zoey Deutch." On Metacritic, the film has a score of 58 out of 100, based on 31 critics, indicating "mixed or average reviews". Audiences polled by CinemaScore gave the film an average grade of "B" on an A+ to F scale, while PostTrak reported filmgoers gave a 72% overall positive score.

Abbey Bender of Uproxx gave the film a generally positive review and praised Ry Russo-Young's direction. She disliked the ending but noted "along the way, though, there are plenty of scenes of compellingly lush nature and teenage girlhood." AllMovie gave it 2.5 stars out of 5, while Susan Wloszczyna of RogerEbert.com gave it 3 out of 4.

Awards and nominations
The film earned a nomination in 2017 Teen Choice Awards Choice Movie: Drama category, and the cast also earned nominations: Zoey Deutch in the 2017 Teen Choice Awards Choice Movie: Drama Actress category and Kian Lawley in the Choice Movie: Drama Actor category for the movie. Lawley went on to win the award.

See also
List of films featuring time loops

References

External links 
 
 
 

2017 films
2010s high school films
2017 independent films
2010s teen drama films
American high school films
American independent films
American mystery drama films
American teen drama films
Awesomeness Films films
Films about road accidents and incidents
Films based on American novels
Films based on young adult literature
Films shot in Vancouver
2010s mystery drama films
Open Road Films films
Fiction about sacrifices
Films set in 2016
Teen mystery films
Time loop films
2017 drama films
2010s English-language films
2010s American films